iHub is an Innovation hub and hacker space for the technology community in Nairobi. It was started in March 2010 by Erik Hersman, a blogger, TED fellow, and entrepreneur and acquired by Co-creation Hub (CcHUB) in 2019. This coworking space, in Senteu Plaza at the junction of Lenana and Galana Roads, is a nexus for technologists, investors, young entrepreneurs, designers, researchers and programmers.

iHub was a pioneering tech hub in Africa, but in 2014 was one of many technology hubs across the continent, with a dozen in Nairobi in 2015, and NaiLab operating within the same building until March 2017.

Facilities
iHub provides a space where members can receive mentorship, business support services, access to startup and product development related workshops and events, and the possibility of venture funding through connections with the local and international venture capital community. The space is a tech community facility with a focus on early stage entrepreneurs, web and mobile phone programmers, designers and researchers. It is part open community workspace (co-working), part vector for investors and venture capitalists, and part incubator.

MLab East Africa
MLab East Africa (stylised as m:lab) is an initiative that "aims to foster innovation and entrepreneurship within the Kenyan community, with a focus on Web and mobile services." It is not revenue generating for the iHub. It is a consortium of four organizations (eMobilis, World Wide Web Foundation, University of Nairobi, and iHub). It has had input from the World Bank Group's infoDev program, under its Digital Entrepreneurship Program that is "scaling Mobile Application Labs (mLabs) ... in Kenya, South Africa, and Senegal".

iHub UX Lab
The iHub UX lab is the first open user experience lab in Sub-Saharan Africa. The UX lab has a mission to develop a user-centered design culture in Africa by helping the local community learn human centered design methods that put the user at the centre of product development. As it stands, most solutions are still built with a tech-centric approach and therefore do not fully understand and design for the users' needs and context. Inevitably, most of these solutions therefore fail to meet the needs of the user and therefore have minimal or no adoption.

Funding and ownership
The space was initially funded by Omidyar Network and Hivos. The lease was initially covered by Ushahidi and the 20 mb Internet connection is covered by Zuku. On 26 September 2019, it was announced that the iHub had been acquired by Co-Creation Hub.

Events
Events held at iHub include BarCamp, Mobile Monday, Random Hacks of Kindness (RHOK), Water Hackathon and AfricaHackOn InfoSec Conference, 2015

iHub developed and executed Tajriba, the first user experience month in Africa. During the month, it involved user centered design experts who helped with workshops for the local community (university students, start-ups, designers, developers, etc.)

Notable people to have given talks at iHub include: Marissa Mayer, Larry Wall and Vint Cerf.

References

External links 
 
 The iHub in Nairobi is here
 iHub in Nairobi, one year later
 Next Billion, best ideas of 2010

Buildings and structures in Nairobi
Science and technology in Kenya